Mario Fransiskus Reyaan (born May 27, 1991) is an Indonesian footballer that currently plays for Persiwa Wamena in the Indonesia Super League.

References

External links
Mario Fransiskus Reyaan at Liga Indonesia

1991 births
Living people
People from Jayawijaya Regency
Indonesian footballers
Liga 1 (Indonesia) players
Persiwa Wamena players
Indonesian Premier Division players
Association football goalkeepers
Sportspeople from Papua